Chabris is a commune in the Indre department in central France.

Located at an important river crossing-place on the road from Valençay to Romorantin with a bridge since Roman times, Chabris was once the site of the ancient Bishop of Bourges's feudal fortress. Its church was built over the tomb of the 6th century hermit Saint Phalier. There is a twinning with Lonsee, in Germany.

Population

Personalities
Luc Montagnier was born in Chabris on 18 August 1932, French virologist and co-recipient of the 2008 Nobel Prize in Physiology or Medicine for his discovery of HIV.

See also
Communes of the Indre department

References

Communes of Indre